A protractor is a measuring instrument, typically made of transparent plastic or glass, for measuring angles.

Some protractors are simple half-discs or full circles.  More advanced protractors, such as the bevel protractor, have one or two swinging arms, which can be used to help measure the angle.

Typical

Most protractors measure angles in degrees (°). Radian-scale protractors measure angles in radians. Most protractors are divided into 180 equal parts. Some precision protractors further divide degrees into arcminutes.

They are used in mechanics, engineering and geometry.

Bevel 

A bevel protractor is a graduated circular protractor with one pivoted arm; used for measuring or marking off angles. Sometimes Vernier scales are attached to give more precise readings. It has wide application in architectural and mechanical drawing, although its use is decreasing with the availability of modern drawing software or CAD.

Universal bevel protractors are also used by toolmakers; as they measure angles by mechanical contact they are classed as mechanical protractors.

The bevel protractor is used to establish and test angles to very close tolerances. It reads to 5 arcminutes (5′ or °) and can measure angles from 0° to 360°.
  
The bevel protractor consists of a beam, a graduated dial and a blade which is connected to a swivel plate (with Vernier scale) by thumb nut and clamp. When the edges of the beam and blade are parallel, a small mark on the swivel plate coincides with the zero line on the graduated dial. To measure an angle between the beam and the blade of 90° or less, the reading may be obtained direct from the graduation number on the dial indicated by the mark on the swivel plate. To measure an angle of over 90°, subtract the number of degrees as indicated on the dial from 180°, as the dial is graduated from opposite zero marks to 90° each way.
  
Since the spaces, both on the main scale and the Vernier scale, are numbered both to the right and to the left from zero, any angle can be measured. The readings can be taken either to the right or to the left, according to the direction in which the zero on the main scale is moved.

Gallery

See also 
 Compass (drawing tool) for drawing circles or arcs
 French curve
 Goniometer
 Inclinometer
 Sliding T bevel
 Birkhoff's axioms
 Technical drawing tools
 Centiturns
 Romer

References

Dimensional instruments
Mathematical tools
Navigational equipment
Technical drawing tools
Angle measuring instruments.